Warwick is a small town north east of Montreal, located in Arthabaska county, Quebec, Canada. The town was incorporated in 1861 and named after a city of the same name in England.

Up until 2014 the town hosted Quebec's annual summer cheese festival, which showcases many of the locally produced artisanal cheeses. In 2014 the festival was moved to Victoriaville. Warwick also claims to be one of the possible birthplaces of poutine (fries with gravy and cheese curds).

It is an industrial centre, with factories for agricultural machinery, washing-machines, overalls, cheese-boxes, and doors.

Warwick is located on Route 116.

Demographics 

References

External links
 
City of Warwick 

Cities and towns in Quebec
Incorporated places in Centre-du-Québec
1861 establishments in Canada